Journal of Adolescent Research is a peer-reviewed academic journal that publishes papers in the field of Psychology. This journal is a member of the Committee on Publication Ethics (COPE). The journal's editor is Nancy L. Deutsch (University of Virginia). It has been in publication since 1986 and is currently published by SAGE Publications. Research published in this journal specialize in qualitative and mixed-method research focusing on adolescent and emerging adult development from a variety of disciplinary perspectives.

Abstracting and indexing 
Journal of Adolescent Research is abstracted and indexed in, among other databases:  SCOPUS, and the Social Sciences Citation Index. According to the Journal Citation Reports, its 2017 impact factor is 1.964, ranking it 33 out of 73 journals in the category ‘Psychology, Developmental’.

References

External links 
 

SAGE Publishing academic journals
English-language journals
Adolescence journals